The men's mass start race of the 2014–15 ISU Speed Skating World Cup 2, arranged in the Taereung International Ice Rink, in Seoul, South Korea, was held on 23 November 2014.

Andrea Giovannini of Italy won the race, while Haralds Silovs of Latvia came second, and Lee Seung-hoon of South Korea came third.

Results
The race took place on Sunday, 23 November, scheduled in the afternoon session, at 15:02.

References

Men mass start
2